Jorge Lara Castro (born 5 August 1945 in Asunción) is a Paraguayan lawyer, sociologist, and diplomat.

He served as the Paraguayan Minister of Foreign Affairs in the cabinet of Fernando Lugo (2011-2012).

References

1945 births
Living people
People from Asunción
Universidad Católica Nuestra Señora de la Asunción alumni
20th-century Paraguayan lawyers
National Autonomous University of Mexico alumni
Paraguayan sociologists
Foreign Ministers of Paraguay
Permanent Representatives of Paraguay to the United Nations